born 1966, was a Japanese video game music composer who worked for Copya System Ltd. He was later a member of Mint Co., Ltd. where he worked with other composers. Mori unfortunately died of stomach cancer on January 8, 1998.

His works

Game Boy
Popeye 2
Volley Fire
Zen-Nippon Pro Wrestling Jet
Zettai Muteki Raijin-Oh

Mega Drive / Genesis
Cutie Suzuki no Ringside Angel

PC Engine
Power Drift

Super Famicom / Super NES
Acrobat Mission
Bassin's Black Bass with Hank Parker (Super Black Bass 2)
Galaxy Robo
Gokinjo Boukentai
Keiba Yosou Baken Renkinjutsou
Kidou Senshi Z-Gundam: Away to the NewType
Koutetsu no Kishi
Koutetsu no Kishi 2: Sabaku no Rommel Shougun
Koutetsu no Kishi 3: Gekitotsu Europe Sensen
Lennus II: Fuuin no Shito (Sound Design-Performer)
Mystic Ark
Otoboke Ninja Colosseum
Paladin's Quest (Sound FXs)
Seifuku Densetsu: Pretty Fighter
Shien - The Blade Chaser (Shien's Revenge)
Shounen Ninja Sasuke (Sound Design)
Super Air Diver (Lock On)
Wonder Project J

Sega Saturn
Seifuku Densetsu: Pretty Fighter X

Nintendo 64
Wonder Project J2

PlayStation
Doraemon 2: SOS! Otogi no Kuni
Pro Wrestling Sengokuden
Pro Wrestling Sengokuden 2

References

External links

 Akihiko Mori at Game Music Composer MEMO

1966 births
1998 deaths
20th-century Japanese composers
Deaths from cancer in Japan
Deaths from stomach cancer
Japanese male composers
Video game composers
20th-century Japanese male musicians